Monument to the sailors and fishermen lost at sea is a notable modern monument and a sightseeing place in Liepāja, Latvia.

The monument was designed by architect Gunārs Asaris and sculptor Alberts Terpilovskis. It was built in 1977 with a funding from LBORF and the fishing kolhoz Boļševiks. The monument is located on the shore of the Baltic Sea in Liepāja seaside park, at the end of Kūrmājas Prospect. Here in the beginning of the 20th century was located Kurhaus. The monument consists of a bronze figure of a woman on 11 meter high V-shaped pedestal, covered by Saaremaa dolomite.

On 8 April 2000 a memorial plate dedicated to American pilots whose aircraft was brought down on 8 April 1950 by the USSR Air Forces near Liepāja was added to the pedestal of the monument.

The Monument in pop culture 
This monument in Liepāja often is called "Crocodile", because of a resemblance to Crocodile Gena from the Soviet cartoon. The inner part of the pedestal is a popular place for taking photographs.

Gallery

References 

Liepāja
Monuments and memorials in Latvia
1977 sculptures
Sculptures in the Soviet Union
1977 establishments in the Soviet Union